This is a list of state leaders in the 13th century (1201–1300) AD, of the Holy Roman Empire.

Main

Holy Roman Empire, Kingdom of Germany (complete list, complete list) –
Otto IV, Holy Roman Emperor (1209–1215), King (1198–1209)
Philip, King (1198–1208)
Otto IV, King (1198–1209)
Frederick II, Holy Roman Emperor (1220–1250), King (1212–1220)
Conrad IV, contender King (1237–1254)
Henry Raspe, rival King (1246–1247)
William II of Holland, rival King (1247–1256)
Richard of Cornwall, contender King (1257–1272)
Alfonso X, rival King (1257–1275)
Rudolf I, contender King (1273–1291)
Adolf, King (1292–1298)
Albert I, King (1298–1308)

Austrian

Duchy of Austria (complete list) –
Leopold VI the Glorious, Duke (1198–1230)
Frederick II the Quarrelsome, Duke (1230–1246)
Vladislaus of Moravia, claimant Duke (1246–1247)
Herman VI of Baden, claimant Duke (1248–1250)
Frederick I of Baden, claimant Duke (1250–1268)
Ottokar II of Bohemia, claimant Duke (1251–1278)
Rudolf I, Duke (1278–1282)
Albert I, Duke (1282–1308)

Prince-Bishopric of Brixen (complete list) –
Konrad of Rodank, Prince-bishop (1200–1216)
Bertold of Neifen, Prince-bishop (1216–1224)
Heinrich of Taufers, Prince-bishop (1224–1239)
Egno of Eppan, Prince-bishop (1240–1250)
Bruno of Kirchberg, Prince-bishop (1250–1288)
Heinrich of Trevejach, Prince-bishop (1290–1295)
Landulf of Milan, Prince-bishop (1295–1300)
Konrad Waldner, Prince-bishop (1301)

Margraviate of Burgau –
, Margrave (?–c.1301)

Duchy of Carinthia (complete list) –
Ulrich II, Duke (1181–1201)
Bernhard, Regent (1199–1202), Duke (1202–1256)
Ulrich III, Duke (1256–1269)
Otakar, Duke (1269–1276)
Rudolph I, Duke (1276–1286)
Meinhard, Duke (1286–1295)
Louis, co-Duke (1295–1305)
Otto III, co-Duke (1295–1310)

Prince-Bishopric of Chur (complete list) –
Reinher della Torre, Prince-bishop (1194–1209)
Arnold von Matsch, Prince-bishop (1209–1221)
Rudolf von Güttingen, Prince-bishop (1224–1226)
Berthold I. von Helfenstein, Prince-bishop (1228–1233)
Ulrich IV. von Kyburg, Prince-bishop (1233/34–1237)
Volkard von Neuburg, Prince-bishop (1237–1251)
Heinrich III. von Montfort, Prince-bishop (1251–1268, 1268–1272)
Konrad III. von Belmont, Prince-bishop (1273–1282)
Friedrich I. von Montfort, Prince-bishop (1282–1290)
Berthold II. Graf von Heiligenberg, Prince-bishop (1291–1298)
Siegfried von Gelnhausen, Prince-bishop (1298–1321)

County of Gorizia (complete list) –
Engelbert III, Count (1191–1220)
Meinhard II, Count (1220–1231)
Meinhard III, Count (1231–1258)
Meinhard IV, Count (1258–1271)
Albert I, Count (1258–1304)

Duchy of Styria (complete list) –
Leopold VI of Austria, Duke (1194–1230)
Frederick II of Austria, Duke (1230–1246)
Ottokar II of Bohemia, Duke (1251/1260–1278)
Béla IV of Hungary, Duke (1254–1258)
Stephen V of Hungary, Duke (1258–1260)
Rudolph I, Duke (1278–1282)
Albert I, Duke (1282–1308)

Prince-Bishopric of Trent (complete list) –
Conrad II di Biseno, Prince-bishop (1188–1205)
Federico Wanga, Prince-bishop (1207–1218)
Albert IV von Ravenstein, Prince-bishop (1219–1223)
Gerard I Oscasali, Prince-bishop (1223–1232)
Aldrighetto di Castelcampo, Prince-bishop (1232–1247)
Egno von Eppan, Prince-bishop (1250–1273)
Henry II, Prince-bishop (1273–1289)
Philipp Buonacolsi, Prince-bishop (1289–1303)

County of Tyrol (complete list) –
Henry I, Count (1180–1202)
Albert IV, Count (1202–1253)
Meinhard I, Count (1253–1258)
Albert, co-Count (1258–1271)
Meinhard II, Count (1258–1295)
Louis of Gorizia-Tyrol, co-Count (1295–1305)
Otto, co-Count (1295–1310)
Henry II, Count (1295–1335)

Bavarian

Duchy of Bavaria: Upper Bavaria, Lower Bavaria (complete list) –
Louis I, Duke (1183–1231)
Otto the Illustrious, Duke (1231–1253)
Louis II the Strict, Duke (1253–1255), Duke of Upper Bavaria (1255–1294)
Henry XIII, Duke of Lower Bavaria (1253–1290)
Louis III, co-Duke of Lower Bavaria (1290–1296)
Stephen I, co-Duke of Lower Bavaria (1290–1310)
Otto III, co-Duke of Lower Bavaria (1290–1312)
Matilda, Regent of Upper Bavaria (1294–1302)
Rudolph I, Duke of Upper Bavaria (1294–1317)

Berchtesgaden Prince-Provostry (complete list) –
Bernhard I of Schönstätten, Provost (1194–1201)
Gerhard, Provost (1201)
Hugo II, Provost (1201–1210)
Konrad Garrer, Provost (1210–1211)
Friedrich II Ellinger, Provost (1211–1217)
Heinrich II, Provost (1217–1231)
Friedrich III of Ortenburg, Provost (1231–1239)
Bernhard II, Provost (1239–1252)
Konrad II, Provost (1252)
Heinrich III, Provost (1252–1257)
Konrad III von Medling, Provost (1257–1283)
Johann I Sachs von Sachsenau, Provost (1283–1303)

Prince-Bishopric of Freising (complete list) –
Waldgrave Emicho, Prince-bishop (1294–1311)

Landgraviate of Leuchtenberg (de:complete list) –
Diepold I, Landgrave (1168–1209)
Gebhardt III, Landgrave (1209–1244)
Diepold II, Landgrave (1209–1259)
Friedrich II, Landgrave (1244–1284)
Gebhardt VI, Landgrave (1279–1293)
, Landgrave (1293–1334)

Prince-Abbey of Niedermünster (complete list) –
Heilka IV von Rotheneck, Abbess (1197–1218)
Heilka V von Wittelsbach, Abbess (1218–1224)
Frideruna von Falkenstein, Abbess (1224–1229)
Mathilde III von Henffenfeld, Abbess (1229–1239)
Tutta III von Dalmässing, Abbess (1239–1242)
Irmgard I von Scheyern, Abbess (1242–1245)
Hildegard von Kirchberg, Abbess (1245–1249)
Kunigunde III von Stein, Abbess (1249–1257)
Kühnheit Pinzingerin, Abbess (1257–c.1259)
Wilburg von Lobsingen, Abbess (c.1259–1261)
Tutta IV von Putingen, Abbess (1261–1264)
Gertrud II. von Stein, Abbess (1264–1271)
Wilburg von Lobsingen, Abbess (1271–1273)
Elisabeth I Stauffin von Stauffenburg, Abbess (1273–1276)
Hedwig Kropflin, Abbess (1276–1285)
Kunigunde IV Hainkhoverin, Abbess (1285–1300)
Adelheid II von Treidenberg, Abbess (1300–1304)

Imperial County of Ortenburg (complete list) –
Rapoto II, Count (1186–1231)
Henry I, Count (1186–1241)
Rapoto III, Count (1231–1248)
Henry II, Count (1241–1257)
Gebhard, Count (1238–1275), Imperial Count (1257–1275)
Diepold, Count (1238–1272)
Rapoto IV, Count (1275–1296), Imperial Count (1275–1296)
Henry III, Count (1297/1321–1345)

Pappenheim (complete list) –
Rudolph I, Lord (1193–1221)
Rudolph II, co-Lord (1221–1233)
Frederick, Lord (1221–1240)
Henry III, Lord (1240–1278)
Henry IV, Lord (1278–1318)

Prince-Bishopric of Passau (complete list) –
Wolfger of Erla, Prince-Bishop (1191–1204)
Poppo, Prince-Bishop (1204–1206)
Manegold of Berg, Prince-Bishop (1206–1215)
Ulrich II, Prince-Bishop (1215–1221)
Gebhard I of Plain, Prince-Bishop (1222–1232)
Rüdiger of Bergheim, Prince-Bishop (1233–1249)
Konrad I, Duke of Silesia-Glogau, Prince-Bishop (1249–1249)
Berthold of Pietengau, Prince-Bishop (1250–1254)
Otto of Lonsdorf, Prince-Bishop (1254–1265)
Wladislaw of Silesia, Prince-Bishop (1265)
Petrus, Bishop of Passau, Prince-Bishop (1265–1280)
Wichard of Pohlheim, Prince-Bishop (1280–1282)
Gottfried, Prince-Bishop (1282–1285)
Bernhard of Prambach, Prince-Bishop (1285–1313)

Prince-Bishopric of Regensburg (complete list) –
Konrad III of Laichling, Prince-bishop (1186–1204)
Konrad IV of Frontenhausen, Prince-bishop (1204–1227)
Siegfried, Prince-bishop (1227–1246)
Albert I of Pietengau, Prince-bishop (1247–1260)
Albertus Magnus, Prince-bishop (1260–1262)
Leo Thundorfer, Prince-bishop (1262–1277)
Heinrich II von Rotteneck, Prince-bishop (1277–1296)
Konrad V von Luppurg, Prince-bishop (1296–1313)

Prince-Archbishopric of Salzburg (complete list) –
Eberhard II of Regensburg, Prince-archbishop (1200–1246)
Bernhard I of Ziegenhain, Prince-archbishop (1247)
Philipp of Carinthia, Prince-archbishop (1247–1256)
Ulrich of Sekau, Prince-archbishop (1256–1265)
Ladislaus of Salzburg, Prince-archbishop (1265–1270)
Frederick II of Walchen, Prince-archbishop (1270–1284)
Rudolf of Hoheneck, Prince-archbishop (1284–1290)
Conrad IV of Breitenfurt, Prince-archbishop (1291–1312)

Bohemian

Kingdom of Bohemia (complete list) –
Ottokar I, Duke (1192–1193, 1197–1198), King (1198–1230)
Wenceslaus I, King (1230–1253)
Ottokar II, King (1253–1278)
Wenceslaus II, King (1278–1305)

Margraviate of Moravia (complete list) –
Vladislaus I Henry, Margrave (1197–1222)
Vladislaus II, Margrave (1222–1227/28)
Přemysl of Moravia, Margrave (1227–1239)
Vladislaus III, Margrave (1239–1247)
Ottokar II, Margrave (1247–1278)
Wenceslaus II, Margrave (1283–1305)

Duchy of Teschen (Cieszyn) (complete list) –
Mieszko I, Duke (1290–1315)

Burgundian-Low Countries

County of Burgundy (complete list) –
Joan I, Countess (1200–1205)
Beatrice II, Countess (1205–1231)
Otto II, Count (1208–1231)
Otto III, Count (1231–1248)
Adelaide, Countess (1248–1279)
Hugh I, Count (1248–1266)
Philip I, Count (1267–1279)
Otto IV, Count (1279–1303)

Duchy of Brabant (complete list) –
Henry I, Duke (1183/1184–1235)
Henry II, Duke (1235–1248)
Henry III, Duke (1248–1261)
Henry IV, Duke (1261–1267)
John I, Duke (1267–1294)
John II, Duke (1294–1312)

County of Flanders (complete list) –
Baldwin IX, Count (1194–1205)
Joan I, Countess (1205–1244)
Ferdinand of Portugal, Count (1212–1233)
Thomas of Savoy-Piedmont, Count (1237–1244)
Margaret II, Countess (1244–1278)
William I, Count (1247–1251)
Guy I, Count (1251–1305)

County of Hainaut (complete list) –
Baldwin VI, Count (1195–1205)
Joan, Countess (1205–1244)
Margaret of Constantinople, Countess (1244–1280)
John I, Count (1246–1257)
John II, Count (1280–1304)

County of Holland (complete list) –
Dirk VII, Count (1190–1203)
Ada, Countess (1203–1207)
Louis II of Loon, Count (1203–1207)
William I, Count (1203–1222)
Floris IV, Count (1222–1234)
William II, Count (1234–1256)
Floris de Voogd, Regent (1256–1258)
Floris V, Count (1256–1296)
John III, Lord of Renesse, Regent (1296)
Wolfert I, Lord of Borselen, Regent (1296–1299)
John I, Count (1296–1299)
John II, Count of Hainaut, Regent (1299), Count (1299–1304)

Duchy of Limburg (complete list) –
Henry III, Duke (1170–1221)
Waleran III, Duke (1221–1226)
Henry IV, Duke (1226–1247)
Waleran IV, Duke (1247–1279)
Ermengarde, Duchess (1279–1283)
John I, Duke (1288–1294)
John II, Duke (1294–1312)

County of Namur (complete list) –
Philip I, Margrave (1195–1212) 
Yolanda, Margravine (1212–1217)
Philip II, Margrave (1217–1226) 
Henry II, Margrave (1226–1229)
Margaret, Margravine (1229–1237)
Baldwin II, Margrave (1237–1256)
Henry III, Margrave (1256–1265)
Guy I, Margrave (1265–1297)
John I, Margrave (1297–1330)

Franconian

Prince-Bishopric of Bamberg (complete list) –
Heinrich I von Bilversheim, Prince-bishop (1245–1257)
Ladislaus of Salzburg, Prince-bishop (1257)
Berthold von Leiningen, Prince-bishop (1257–1285)
Mangold von Neuenburg, Prince-bishop (1285)
Arnold von Solms, Prince-bishop (1286–1296)
Leopold I von Grundlach, Prince-bishop (1296–1303)

County of Castell (complete list) –
Rupert I, Count (1200–1223)
Louis, co-Count (1223–1230)
Rupert II, co-Count (1223–1235)
Albert II, Count (1235–1254)
Frederick II, co-Count (1235–1251)
Henry I, Count co-Count (1235–1254)
Frederick III, Count (1251–1254)

County of Castell, Elder Line (complete list) –
Henry II, Count (1254–1307)

County of Castell, Younger Line (complete list) –
Albert II, Count (1254–1258)
Herman II, Count (1258–1285)
Frederick IV Count of Younger Line (1285–1347), Count (1347–1349)

Prince-Bishopric of Würzburg (complete list) –
Konrad von Querfurt, Prince-bishop (1197–1202)
Heinrich IV von Katzburg, Prince-bishop (1202–1207)
Otto von Lobdeburg, Prince-bishop (1207–1223)
Dietrich von Homburg, Prince-bishop (1223–1225)
Hermann I von Lobdeburg, Prince-bishop (1225–1254)
Iring von Reinstein-Homburg, Prince-bishop (1254–1266)
Heinrich V von Leiningen, Prince-bishop (1254–1255)
Poppo III von Trimberg, Prince-bishop (1267–1271)
Berthold I von Henneberg, Prince-bishop (1271–1274)
Berthold II von Sternberg, Prince-bishop (1274–1287)
Mangold von Neuenburg, Prince-bishop (1287–1303)

Electoral Rhenish

Archbishopric/ Elector-Archbishopric of Cologne (complete list) –
Adolf I von Berg, Prince-Archbishop (1192–1205)
Bruno IV von Sayn, Prince-Archbishop (1205–1208, in opposition)
Dietrich I von Hengebach, Prince-Archbishop (1208–1215, in opposition)
Engelbert II von Berg, Prince-Archbishop (1216–1225)
Heinrich I von Mulnarken, Prince-Archbishop (1225–1237)
Konrad von Hochstaden, Archbishop-elector (1238–1261)
Engelbert II von Falkenburg, Archbishop-elector (1261–1274)
Siegfried II of Westerburg, Archbishop-elector (1274–1297)
Wikbold I von Holte, Archbishop-elector (1297–1304)

County Palatine of the Rhine (complete list) –
Henry V, Count (1195–1213)
Henry VI, Count (1213–1214)
Louis I the Kelheimer, Count (1214–1231)
Otto II the Illustrious, Count (1231–1253)
Louis II the Strict, Count (1253–1294)
Rudolph I the Stammerer, Count (1296–1317)

Prince/Elector-Bishopric of Mainz (complete list) –
Luitpold von Scheinfeld, Prince-archbishop (1200–1208)
Sigfried II von Eppstein, opposing Prince-archbishop (1200–1208), Prince-archbishop (1208–1230)
Sigfried III von Eppstein, Prince-archbishop (1230–1249)
Christian von Weisenau, Prince-archbishop (1249–1251)
Gerhard I von Daun-Kirberg, Archbishop-elector (1251–1259)
Werner II von Eppstein, Archbishop-elector (1260–1284)
Heinrich II von Isny, Archbishop-elector (1286–1288)
Gerhard II von Eppstein, Archbishop-elector (1286–1305)

Nieder-Isenburg (Lower Isenburg) (complete list) –
Theodoric I, Count (1218–1253)
Theodoric II, Count (1253–1273)
Salentin I, Count (1273–1300)
Salentin II, Count (1300–1334)

Elector-Bishopric of Trier (complete list) –
John I, Archbishop-elector (1189–1212)
Theodoric II, Archbishop-elector (1212–1242)
Arnold II von Isenburg, Archbishop-elector (1242–1259)
Heinrich I von Finstingen, Archbishop-elector (1260–1286)
Bohemond I von Warnesberg, Archbishop-elector (1286–1299)
Diether von Nassau, Archbishop-elector (1300–1307)

Lower Rhenish–Westphalian

County of Bentheim (complete list) –
Sophia, Countess (1149–1176) and Dirk of Holland, Count (1149–1157)
Otto I, Count (1176–1207)
Baldwin, Count (1207–1247)
Otto II, Count (1247–1277)

Bentheim-Bentheim (complete list) –
Egbert, Count (1277–1305)

Bentheim-Tecklenburg (complete list) –
Otto III, Count (1277–1338)
Otto IV, Count (1289–1302)

Duchy of Cleves (complete list) –
Arnold II, Count (1198–1201)
Dietrich V, Count (1201–1260)
Dietrich VI, Count (1260–1275)
Dietrich VII of Meissen, Count (1275–1305)

Princely Abbey of Corvey (de:complete list) –
Hugold von Luthardessen, Abbot (1216–1220), Prince-abbot (1220–1223)
, Prince-abbot (1223–1254)
Thimo, Prince-abbot (1254–1275)
, Prince-abbot (1275–1306)

Essen Abbey (complete list) –
Elisabeth I, Princess-Abbess (1172–pre-1216)
Adelheid, Princess-Abbess (1216–1237)
Elisabeth II, Princess-Abbess (c.1237–1241)
Bertha of Arnsberg, Princess-Abbess (pre-1243–1292)
Beatrix von Holte, Princess-Abbess (1292–1327)

County of Guelders (complete list) –
Otto I, Count (1182–1207)
Gerard III, Count (1207–1229)
Otto II, Count (1229–1271)
Reginald I, Count (1271–1318)

Herford Abbey (complete list) –
Eilika, Abbess (c. 1212)
Gertrud II of Lippe, Abbess (pre-1217–post-1233)
Ida, Abbess (pre-1238–post-1264)
Pinnosa, Abbess (pre-1265–post-1276)
Mechtild II of Waldeck, Abbess (pre-1277–post-1288)
Irmgard of Wittgenstein, Abbess (pre-1290–1323)

Prince-Bishopric of Liège (complete list) –
Hugh of Pierrepont, Prince-Bishop (1200–1229)
John of Eppes, Prince-Bishop (1229–1238)
William of Savoy, Prince-Bishop (1238–1239)
Robert of Thourotte, Prince-Bishop (1240–1246)
Henry of Guelders, Prince-Bishop (1247–1274)
John of Enghien, Prince-Bishop (1274–1281)
John of Flanders, Prince-Bishop (1282–1291)
Hugh of Chalon, Prince-Bishop (1295–1301)

County of Luxemburg (complete list) –
Ermesinde, Countess (1197–1247)
Theobald, Count (1197–1214)
Waleran, Count (1214–1226)
Henry V, Count (1247–1281)
Henry VI, Count (1281–1288)
Henry VII, Count (1288–1313)

County of Mark (complete list) –
Adolph I, Count (1198–1249)
Engelbert I, Count (1249–1277)
Eberhard II, Count (1277–1308)

Prince-Bishopric of Münster (complete list) –
Hermann II of Katzenelnbogen, Prince-bishop (1180–1202)
Otto I of Oldenburg, Prince-bishop (1203–1218)
Dietrich of Isenberg, Prince-bishop (1219–1226)
Ludolf of Holte, Prince-bishop (1226–1247)
Otto II of Lippe, Prince-bishop (1247–1259)
Wilhelm I of Holte, Prince-bishop (1259–1260)
Gerhard of the March, Prince-bishop (1261–1272)
Everhard of Diest, Prince-bishop (1275–1301)

County of Oldenburg (complete list) –
Maurice I, Count (1168–1211)
Otto I, Count (1209–1251)
Christian II, Count  (1211–1233)
John I, Count (1233–1272)
Christian III, Count (1272–1278)
Otto II, Count of Oldenburg-Delmenhorst, Count (1272–1301)
John II, Count (1278–1305)

Prince-Bishopric of Osnabrück (complete list) –
Engelbert I von Isenberg, Prince-bishop (1225–1226)
Otto I, Prince-bishop (1206–1227)
Konrad I von Velber, Prince-bishop (1227–1239)
Engelbert I von Isenberg, Prince-bishop (1239–1250)
Bruno von Isenberg, Prince-bishop (1251–1258)
Balduin von Rüssel, Prince-bishop (1259–1264)
Widukind von Waldeck, Prince-bishop (1265–1269)
Konrad von Rietberg, Prince-bishop (1270–1297)
Ludwig von Ravensberg, Prince-bishop (1297–1308)

County of Runkel (complete list) –
Siegfried III, Count (1219–1227)
Theodoric I, Count (1227–?)
Siegfried, Count (?–1228)

County of Schaumburg (complete list) –
Adolf III, Count (1164–1225)
Adolf IV, Count (1225–1238)
Gerhard I, Count (1238–1290)
Adolph VI the Elder, Count (1290–1315)

Prince-Bishopric of Utrecht (complete list) –
Dirk II van Are), Prince-bishop (1197/98–1212)
Otto I van Gelre, Prince-bishop (1212–1215)
Otto II van Lippe, Prince-bishop (1216–1227)
Wilbrand van Oldenburg, Prince-bishop (1227–1233)
Otto III van Holland, Prince-bishop (1233–1249)
Gozewijn van Amstel (van Randerath) (1249–1250)
Henry I van Vianden, Prince-bishop (1250/52–1267)
John I of Nassau, Prince-bishop (1267–1290)
John II van Sierck, Prince-bishop (1290–1296)
Willem II Berthout, Prince-bishop (1296–1301)

Prince-Bishopric of Verden (complete list) –
Iso of Wölpe, Prince-Bishop (1205–1231)
Luder of Borch, Prince-Bishop (1231–1251)
Gerard of Hoya, Prince-Bishop ( 1251–1269)
Conrad of Brunswick and Lunenburg, Prince-Bishop (1269–1300)
Frederick Man of Honstädt, Prince-Bishop (1300–1312)

County of Wied (complete list) –
George, Count (1197–1219)
Lothar, Count (?–1243)
merge to form Isenburg-Wied

Upper Rhenish

County of Bar (complete list) –
Theobald I, Count (1189–1214)
Henry II, Count (1214–1239)
Theobald II, Count (1239–1291)
Henry III, Count (1291–1302)

Prince-Bishopric of Basel (complete list) –
Leuthold I von Rotheln, Prince-bishop (1192–1213)
Walther von Rotheln, Prince-bishop (1213–1215)
Heinrich II von Thun, Prince-bishop (1216–1238)
Leuthold II von Arburg, Prince-bishop (1238–1249)
Berthold II von Pfirt, Prince-bishop (1250–1262)
Heinrich III von Neuenburg-Erguel, Prince-bishop (1262–1274)
Heinrich IV Knoderer, Prince-bishop (1275–1286)
Peter I Reich von Reichenstein, Prince-bishop (1286–1296)
Peter von Aspelt, Prince-bishop (1297–1306)

Princely Abbey of Fulda (complete list) –
, Prince-abbot (1221–1249)
, Prince-abbot (1249–1261)
, Prince-abbot (1261–1271)
, Prince-abbot (1271–1272)
, Prince-abbot (1273–1286)
, Prince-abbot (1286–1288)
, Prince-abbot (1288–1313)

Landgraviate of Hesse (complete list) –
Henry I the Child, Landgrave (1264–1308)

Isenburg-Braunsberg (complete list) –
Bruno II, Count (1210–1255)
Bruno III, Count (1255–1278)
John I, Count (1278–1327)

Isenburg-Covern (complete list) –
Gerlach II, Count (1158–1217)
Gerlach III, Count (1217–1235)
Henry, Count (1229–1263)
Frederick I, Count (1246–1272)
Frederick II, Count (1272–1277)
Robin, Count (1272–1306)

Isenburg-Grenzau (complete list) –
Henry I, Count (1158–1220)
Henry II, Count (1220–1286)
Eberhard I, Count (1286–1290)

Isenburg-Kempenich (complete list) –
Salentin and Rosemann, Count (12th/13th century)
Theodoric II, Count (?–1232)
Theodoric III, Count (13th century)
Gerard I, Count (13th/14th century)

Isenburg-Limburg (complete list) –
Gerlach IV, Count of Isenburg-Grenzau (1220/1227–1258), Count of Isenburg-Limburg (1258–1289)
John I the Blind Lord, Count (1289–1312/19)

County of Leiningen (de:complete list) –
Emich III, Count (fl.1193–1208)
Friedrich I, Count (c.1208–pre-1220)
Friedrich II, Count (?–1237)
Simon, Count (c.1237–1234)
Friedrich III, Count (c.1234–1287)
Friedrich IV, Count (c.1287–1316)

Leiningen-Landeck –
Emich IV, Count (?–c.1276)
Emich V, Count (?–1289)

Duchy of Lorraine (complete list) –
Simon II, Duke (1176–1205)
Frederick I, Duke (1205–1206)
Frederick II, Duke (1206–1213)
Theobald I, Duke (1213–1220)
Matthias II, Duke (1220–1251)
Frederick III, Duke (1251–1302)

County of Nassau-Saarbrücken (complete list) –
Simon II, Count (1182–1207)
Simon III, Count (1207–1245)
Lauretta, Count (1245–1271)
Mathilde, Count (1271–1274)
Simon IV, Count (1271–1308)

Lower Salm (complete list) –
Frederick II, Count (1172–1210)
Gerhard, Count (1210–1240)
Henry III, Count (1240–1247)
Henry IV, Count (1247–1265)
William, Count (1265–1297)
Henry V, Count (1297–1336)

Upper Salm (complete list) –
Henry I, Count (1165–1210)
Henry II, Count (1210–1240)
Henry III, Count (1240–1293)
John I, Count (1293–1326)

Salm-Blankenburg (complete list) –
Frederick I, Count (1210–1270)
Henry I, Count (1270–1301)

County of Sayn (complete list) –
Henry I/II, co-Count (1176–1203)
Eberhard II, co-Count (1176–1202)
Henry II/III, Count (1202–1246)
John I (Count of Sponheim-Starkenburg), Regent (1226–1246)
Mechtilde, Count (fl.1278–1282)
John I, Count (1283–1324)

Prince-Bishopric of Sion (complete list) –
Nantelme of Écublens, Prince-Bishop (1196–1203)
Guillaume of Saillon, Prince-Bishop (1203–1205)
Landry of Mont, Prince-Bishop (1206–1237)
Boson II of Granges, Prince-Bishop (1237–1243)
Henri of Rarogne, Prince-Bishop (1243–1271)
Rodolphe of Valpelline, Prince-Bishop (1271–1273)
Pierre of Oron, Prince-Bishop (1273–1287)
Boniface of Challant, Prince-Bishop (1289–1308)

Solms-Braunfels (complete list) –
Henry III, Count (1258–1312)

Prince-Bishopric of Speyer (complete list) –
Conrad III of Scharfenberg, Prince-bishop (1200–1224)
Beringer of Entringen, Prince-bishop (1224–1232)
Konrad IV of Dahn, Prince-bishop (1233–1236)
Konrad V of Eberstein, Prince-bishop (1237–1245)
Heinrich of Leiningen, Prince-bishop (1245–1272)
Friedrich of Bolanden, Prince-bishop (1272–1302)

Prince-Bishopric of Strasbourg (complete list) –
Konrad II von Hühnenburg, Prince-Bishop (1190–1202)
Heinrich II von Veringen, Prince-Bishop (1202–1223)
Berthold I von Teck, Prince-Bishop (1223–1244)
Heinrich III von Stahleck, Prince-Bishop (1243 bis–1260)
Walter von Geroldseck, Prince-Bishop (1260–1263)
Heinrich IV von Geroldseck, Prince-Bishop (1263–1273)
Konrad of Lichtenberg, Prince-Bishop (1273–1299)
Friedrich I von Lichtenberg, Prince-Bishop (1299–1306)

County of Wied (complete list) –
George, Count (1197–1219)
Lothar, Count (1219–1243)
united into Isenburg-Wied

Prince-Bishopric of Worms (complete list) –
Luitpold von Schonfeld, Prince-bishop (1196–1217)
Henry II of Saarbrücken, Prince-bishop (1217–1234)
Landolf of Hoheneck, Prince-bishop (1234–1247)
Konrad III von Durkheim, Prince-bishop (1247)
Richard of Dhaun, Prince-bishop (1247–1257)
Eberhard I of Baumberg, Prince-bishop (1257–1277)
Friedrich of Baumberg, Prince-bishop (1277–1283)
Simon von Schoneck, Prince-bishop (1283–1291)
Eberhard II von Strahlenberg, Prince-bishop (1291–1293)
Emicho of Baumberg, Prince-bishop (1294–1299)
Eberwin von Kronenberg, Prince-bishop (1300–1308)

Lower Saxon

Duchy of Saxony (complete list) –
Bernhard, Duke (1180–1212)
Albert I, Duke (1212–1260)
John I, co-Duke (1260–1282)
Albert II, co-Duke of Saxony (1260–1296), of Saxe-Wittenberg (1296–1298)
Albert III, co-Duke of Saxony (1282–1296), Duke of Saxe-Lauenburg (1296–1303), of Saxe-Ratzeburg (1303–1308)
John II, co-Duke of Saxony (1282–1296), Duke of Saxe-Lauenburg (1296–1303), of Saxe-Mölln (1303–1322)
Eric I, co-Duke of Saxony (1282–1296), Duke of Saxe-Lauenburg (1296–1303), of Saxe-Bergedorf (1303–1321), of Saxe-Ratzeburg (1308–1338)

Saxe-Lauenburg (complete list) –
Albert III, co-Duke of Saxony (1282–1296), Duke of Saxe-Lauenburg (1296–1303), of Saxe-Ratzeburg (1303–1308)
John II, co-Duke of Saxony (1282–1296), Duke of Saxe-Lauenburg (1296–1303), of Saxe-Mölln (1303–1322)
Eric I, co-Duke of Saxony (1282–1296), Duke of Saxe-Lauenburg (1296–1303), of Saxe-Bergedorf (1303–1321), of Saxe-Ratzeburg (1308–1338)

Prince-Archbishopric of Bremen (complete list) –
Hartwig II, Prince-archbishop (1192–1207)
Burchard I, Prince-archbishop (1207–1210)
Valdemar of Denmark, Prince-archbishop (1208–1217)
Gerard I, Prince-archbishop (1210–1219)
Gerhard II of Lippe, Prince-archbishop (1219–1258)
Hildebold, Count of Wunstorf, Prince-archbishop (1258–1273)
Gilbert of Brunckhorst, Prince-archbishop (1274–1306)

Duchy of Brunswick-Lüneburg (complete list) –
Otto I the Child, Duke (1235–1252)
Albert I the Tall, Duke of Brunswick-Lüneburg (1252–1269), Prince of Brunswick-Wolfenbüttel (1269–1279), Regent of Lüneburg (1277–1279)
John I, Duke of Brunswick-Lüneburg (1252–1269), Prince of Lüneburg (1269–1277)

Principality of Brunswick-Wolfenbüttel/ Principality of Wolfenbüttel (complete list) –
Albert I the Tall, Duke of Brunswick-Lüneburg (1252–1269), Prince of Brunswick-Wolfenbüttel (1269–1279), Regent of Lüneburg (1277–1279)
Henry I the Admirable, co-Prince of Brunswick-Wolfenbüttel (1279–1291), Prince of Grubenhagen (1291–1322)
William I, co-Prince (1279–1291), Prince (1291–1292)
Albert II the Fat, Prince of Brunswick-Wolfenbüttel (1279–1291, 1292–1318), of Göttingen (1286–1318)

Gandersheim Abbey (complete list) –
Mechthild I, Princess-Abbess (1196–1223)
Bertha II, Princess-Abbess (1223–1252)
Margarete I, Princess-Abbess (1253–1305)

Principality of Grubenhagen (complete list) –
Henry I the Admirable, co-Prince of Brunswick-Wolfenbüttel (1279–1291), Prince of Grubenhagen (1291–1322)

Prince-Bishopric of Hildesheim (complete list) –
Conrad II of Reifenberg, Prince-bishop (1235–1246)
, Prince-bishop (1247–1257)
, Prince-bishop (1257–1260)
, Prince-bishop (1260–1279)
Siegfried II of Querfurt, Prince-bishop (1279–1310)

County of Holstein (complete list) –
Adolf III, Count (1164–1203)
Valdemar II of Denmark, Count (1203–1208)
, Count (1208–1227)
Adolf IV, Count (1227–1238)
Heilwig of Lippe, Regent (1238–c.1243)
John I, co-Count of Holstein (1238–1261), Count of Holstein-Kiel (1261–1263)
Gerhard I, co-Count of Holstein (1238–1261), Count of Holstein-Itzehoe (1261–1290)

Holstein-Itzehoe –
Gerhard I, co-Count of Holstein (1238–1261), Count of Holstein-Itzehoe (1261–1290)

Holstein-Kiel (complete list) –
John I, co-Count of Holstein (1238–1261), Count of Holstein-Kiel (1261–1263)
Adolph V, co-Count of Holstein-Kiel (1263–1273), Count of Holstein-Segeberg (1273–1308)
John II the One-Eyed, co-Count of Holstein-Kiel (1263–1273), Count (1273–1316)

Holstein-Segeberg –
Adolph V, co-Count of Holstein-Kiel (1263–1273), Count of Holstein-Segeberg (1273–1308)

Holstein-Plön (complete list) –
Gerhard II the Blind, Count (1290–1312)

Holstein-Rendsburg (complete list) –
Henry I, Count (1290–1304)

Holstein-Pinneberg (Holstein-Schaumburg) (complete list) –
Adolph VI the Elder, Count (1290–1315)

Prince-bishopric of Lübeck (complete list) –
Theodoric I, Prince-bishop (1186–1210)
Bertold, Prince-bishop (1210–1230)
John I, Prince-bishop (1230/1231–1247)
Albert I, Prince-bishop (1247–1253)
John II, Prince-bishop (1254–1259)
John III, Prince-bishop (1260–1276)
Burkhard of Serkem, Prince-bishop (1276–1317)

Free City of Lübeck (complete list) –
, Mayor (1229–1230, 1232–1233, 1236, 1240)
Hinrich Witte, Mayor (1227–1236)
Gottschalck v. Bardewik, Mayor (1229, 1233–1234, 1240, 1244)
, Mayor (1250, 1253)
Marquard von Hagen, Mayor (1230–1240)
Hinrich Vorrade, Mayor (1238–1263)
Hildemar, Mayor (1250–1266)
Hinrich v. Wittenborg, Mayor (1255–1256, 1259, 1261, 1268–1269, 1273)
, Mayor (1263, 1266, 1269, 1277, 1281, 1283, 1285, 1287)
Vromold von Vifhusen, Mayor (1271 und 1286)
, Mayor (1276–1277, 1286–1287, 1289, 1291–1294, 1298)
, Mayor (1266, 1273–1274)
Bertram Stalbuk, Mayor (1276, 1281, 1283)
Hildebrand v. Mölln, Mayor (1269–1287)
Arnold Schotelmund, Mayor (1271–1291)
Alwin vom Steene, Mayor (1289–1290)
, Mayor (1292, 1299–1317)
, Mayor (1286, 1290, 1293, 1297–1300)
Dietrich Vorrade, Mayor (1291)
Bernhard von Coesfeld, Mayor (1299–1301)

Principality of Lüneburg (complete list) –
John I, Duke of Brunswick-Lüneburg (1252–1269), Prince of Lüneburg (1269–1277)
Albert I the Tall, Duke of Brunswick-Lüneburg (1252–1269), Prince of Brunswick-Wolfenbüttel (1269–1279), Regent of Lüneburg (1277–1279)
Conrad, Regent (1277–1282)
Otto II the Strict, Prince (1277–1330)

Prince-Archbishopric of Magdeburg (complete list) –
Ludolf of Koppenstedt, Prince-archbishop (1192–1205)
Albert I of Käfernburg, Prince-archbishop (1205–1232)
Burkhard I of Woldenberg, Prince-archbishop (1232–1235)
Wilbrand of Kasernberg, Prince-archbishop (1235–1254)
Rudolf of Dinselstadt, Prince-archbishop (1254–1260)
Rupert of Mansfeld, Prince-archbishop (1260–1266)
Conrad II of Sternberg, Prince-archbishop (1266–1277)
Günther I of Schwalenberg, Prince-archbishop (1277–1279)
Bernhard III of Wolpe, Prince-archbishop (1279–1282)
Eric of Brandenburg, Prince-archbishop (1282–1295)
Burkhard II of Blankenburg, Prince-archbishop (1295–1305)

Mecklenburg (complete list) –
Henry Borwin I, Lord (1178–1219)
Nicholas II, co-Lord (1219–1225)
Henry Borwin II, co-Lord (1219–1226)
John I the Theologian, Lord (1227–1264)
Henry I the Pilgrim, Lord (1264–1275, 1299–1302)
Albert I, co-Lord (1264–1265)
Nicholas III, co-Lord (1264–1289)
Henry II the Lion, Lord (1290–1329)

County of Oldenburg (complete list) –
Maurice I, Count (1168–1211)
Otto I, Count (1209–1251)
Christian II, Count (1211–1233)
John I, Count (1233–1272)
Christian III, Count (1272–1278)
Otto II, Count (1272–1301)
John II, Count (1278–1305)

Lordship of Parchim-Richenberg –
Pribislaus I, Lord (1227–1256)

Lordship of Rostock –
Henry Borwin III, Lord (1227–1278)
Waldemar, Lord (1278–1282)
Agnes of Holstein-Kiel, Regent (1282–1284)
Nicholas I the Child, Lord (1282–1314)

Werle (complete list) –
Nicholas I, Lord (1227–1277)
John I, co-Lord of Werle (1277–1281), of Werle-Parchim (1281–1283)
Bernard I, co-Lord of Werle (1277–1281), of Werle-Prisannewitz (1281–1286)
Henry I, co-Lord of Werle (1277–1281), of Werle-Güstrow (1281–1291)
Nicholas II, Lord of Werle-Parchim (1291–1294), of Werle (1294–1316)

Werle-Prisannewitz (complete list) –
Bernard I, co-Lord of Werle (1277–1281), of Werle-Prisannewitz (1281–1286)

Werle-Güstrow (complete list) –
Henry I, co-Lord of Werle (1277–1281), of Werle-Güstrow (1281–1291)
Henry II, Lord (1291–1294)
inherited by Werle-Parchim

Werle-Parchim (complete list) –
John I, co-Lord of Werle (1277–1281), of Werle-Parchim (1281–1283)
Nicholas II, Lord of Werle-Parchim (1291–1294), of Werle (1294–1316)

Upper Saxon

County/ Principality of Anhalt (complete list) –
Bernard I, Count (1170–1212)
Henry I, Count (1212–1218), Prince (1218–1252)

Anhalt-Aschersleben (complete list) –
Henry II the Fat, Prince (1252–1266)
Matilda of Brunswick-Lüneburg, Regent (1266–1270)
Henry III, co-Prince (1266–1283)
Otto I, co-Prince (1270–1304)

Anhalt-Bernburg (complete list) –
Bernhard I, Prince (1252–1287)
John I, co-Prince (1287–1291)
Bernhard II, Prince (1287–1323)

Anhalt-Zerbst (complete list) –
Siegfried I, Prince (1252–1298)
Albert I, Prince (1298–1316)

Margraviate of Brandenburg (complete list) –
Otto II the Generous, Margrave (1184–1205)
Albert II, Margrave (1205–1220)
John I, co-Margrave (1220–1266)
Otto III the Pious, co-Margrave (1220–1267)

Margraviate of Brandenburg-Stendal (complete list) –
John II, co-Margrave (1266–1281)
Conrad, co-Margrave (1266–1304)
Otto IV of the Arrow, co-Margrave (1266–1308/09)
Henry I Lackland, co-Margraviate of Brandenburg-Stendal (1294–1317), of Brandenburg (1317–1318)

Margraviate of Brandenburg-Salzwedel (complete list) –
John III of Prague, co-Margrave (1267–1268)
Otto VI the Short, co-Margrave (1267–1286)
Otto V the Tall, co-Margrave (1267–1298)
Albert III, co-Margrave (1267–1300)
Herman I the Tall, co-Margrave (1298/99–1308)

Margravate of Meissen (complete list) –
Dietrich I, Margrave (1198–1221)
Henry III, Margrave (1221–1288)
Albert II, Margrave (1288)
Frederick I, Margrave (1291–1323)
Adolf, Margrave (1293–1298)
Albert III, Margrave (1298–1307)

Duchy of Pomerelia (complete list) –
Sambor I, Duke (1177/79–1205)
Mestwin I, Duke (1205–1219/20)
Swietopelk II, Duke (1215–1266)
Mestwin II, Duke (1273–1294)
Przemysł II, Duke (1294–1296)

Pomerania-Demmin (complete list) –
Anastasia of Greater Poland, Regent (1187–1208)
Casimir II, Duke (1187–1219)
Ingard of Denmark, Regent (1219–1226)
Wartislaw III, Duke (1219–1264)

Pomerania-Schlawe-Stolp (complete list) –
, Duke (c.1190–1223)	
Racibor II, Duke (1223–1238)

Duchy of Pomerania, Pomerania-Stettin, Pomerania-Wolgast (complete list) –
Anastasia of Greater Poland, Regent (1187–1208)
Bogislaw II, Duke of Pomerania-Stettin (1187–1220)
Miroslava of Pomerelia, Regent (1220–1226)
Barnim I the Good, Duke of Pomerania-Stettin (1220–1264), of Pomerania (1264–1278)
Bogislaw IV, co-Duke of Pomerania (1278–c.1295) Duke of Pomerania-Wolgast (c.1295–1309)
Matilda of Brandenburg, Regent of Pomerania (1278–1294)
Barnim II, co-Duke of Pomerania (1278–c.1295)
Otto I, co-Duke of Pomeranian (1278–c.1295), Duke of Pomerania-Stettin (c.1295–1344)

Duchy of Saxe-Wittenberg (complete list) –
Albert II, co-Duke of Saxony (1260–1296), of Saxe-Wittenberg (1296–1298)
Rudolph I, Duke (1298–1356), Elector (1356)

County of Stolberg (de:complete list) –
, Count (c.1240–1282)
, Count (pre-1230–1272)
 und Vockstedt (pre-1280–post-1296)

Landgraviate of Thuringia (complete list) –
Hermann I the Hard, Landgrave (1190–1217)
Louis IV the Holy, Landgrave (1217–1227)
Hermann II, Landgrave (1227–1241)
Henry Raspe, Landgrave (1241–1242)
Henry the Illustrious, Landgrave (1242–1265)
Albert the Degenerate, Landgrave (1265–1294)
Adolf of Nassau-Weilburg, Landgrave (1294–1298)
Albert of Habsburg, Landgrave (1298–1307)
Theodoric IV, Landgrave (1298–1307)
Frederick I, Landgrave (1298–1323)

Swabian

Duchy of Swabia (complete list) –
Philip, Duke (1196–1208)
Frederick VII, Duke (1212–1216)
Henry II, Duke (1216–1235)
Conrad III, Duke (1235–1254)
Conrad IV the Younger, Duke (1254–1268)
Rudolf, Duke (1283–1290)
John Parricida, Duke (1290–1309)

Prince-Bishopric of Augsburg (complete list) –
Udalschalk, Prince-bishop (1184–1202)
Hartwig II, Prince-bishop (1202–1208)
Siegfried III of Rechberg, Prince-bishop (1208–1227)
Siboto of Seefeld, Prince-bishop (1227–1247)
Hartmann of Dillingen, Prince-bishop (1248–1286)
Siegfried IV of Algertshausen, Prince-bishop (1286–1288)
Wolfhard of Roth, Prince-bishop (1288–1302)

 (complete list) –
Herman V, Margrave (1190–1243)
Herman VI, Margrave (1243–1250)
Frederick I, co-Margrave (1250–1268)
Rudolph I, co-Margrave (1250–1288)
Herman VII the Rouser, Margrave (1288–1291)
Rudolph II the Elder, co-Margrave (1288–1295)
Hesso I, co-Margrave (1288–1297)
Rudolph III the Younger, co-Margrave (1288–1332)
Rudolph Hesso, Margrave (1297–1335)

 (complete list) –
Henry I, Margrave (1190–1231)
Henry II, Margrave (1231–1289)
Henry III, Margrave (1289–1330)

Margraviate of Baden-Eberstein (complete list) –
Frederick II, Margrave (1291–1333)

Margraviate of Baden-Pforzheim (complete list) –
Herman VIII, co-Margrave (1291–1300)
Rudolph IV, Margrave of Baden-Pforzheim (1291–1348), of Baden-Baden (1335–1348)

Prince-Bishopric of Constance (complete list) –
, Prince-bishop (1190–1206)
, Prince-bishop (1206–1209)
, Prince-bishop (1209–1233)
, Prince-bishop (1233–1248)
, Prince-bishop (1248–1274)
, Prince-bishop (1274–1293)
, Prince-bishop (1293–1306)

Ellwangen Abbey (complete list) –
Kuno, Prince-abbot (1188–1221)
Adalbert III, Prince-abbot (c.1225–1240)
Siegfried, Prince-abbot (1240–1242?)
Rugger, Prince-abbot (1242?–1245 (1247?))
Gotbald of Neresheim, Prince-abbot (1247–1249?)
Rudolf, Prince-abbot (1249–1255?)
Otto of Wülzburg, Prince-abbot (1255–1269)
Konrad, Prince-abbot (1269–1278)
Ekkehard of Schwabsberg, Prince-abbot (1278–1309)

Princely Abbey of Kempten (complete list) –
Werner of Kalbsangst, Prince-abbot (?–1208)
Rudolf II Wolfgang of Königsegg, Prince-abbot (1208–1213)
Henry III by Burtenbach, Prince-abbot (1213–1224)
Henry IV of Sömmerau, Prince-abbot (1224–1234)
Arnold, Prince-abbot (1234–1235)
Gebhard Orteck, Prince-abbot (1235–1237)
Friedrich V of Münster, Prince-abbot (1237–1239)
Theothun II Birkh of Felsberg, Prince-abbot (1239–1240)
Overger Randecker, Prince-abbot (1240–1242)
Hartmann III Mulegg, Prince-abbot (1242–1251)
Hugo, Prince-abbot (1251–1253)
Ulrich III Nordlinger, Prince-abbot (1253–1255)
Ruprecht I, Prince-abbot (1255–1268)
Eberhard IV Burgberger, Prince-abbot (1268–1270)
Rudolf III of Hohenegg, Prince-abbot (1270–1284)
Guido Ritzner, Prince-abbot (1284–1286)
Konrad III von Gundelfingen, Prince-abbot (1286–1302)

County of Hohenberg (complete list) –
Burkhard IV, Count (1195–1217/25)
Burchard V, Count (1217/25–1253)
Albrecht II, Count (1253–1298)
Rudolf I, Count (1298–1336)

Weingarten Abbey (complete list) –
Hermann of Biechtenweiler, Prince-abbot (1265–1299)
Friedrich Heller von Hellerstein, Prince-abbot (1300–1315)

Barony of Westerburg (complete list) –
Henry of Westerburg, Baron (?–1288)

County of Württemberg (complete list) –
Hartmann, Count (1181–1236)
Ludwig III, Count (1194–1226)
Ulrich I, Count (1241–1265)
Ulrich II, Count (1265–1279)
Eberhard I, Count (1279–1325)

Swiss Confederacy

Italy

March of Istria –
Berthold II, Margrave (1188–1204)
Henry II, Margrave (1204–1228)
Otto I, Margrave (1228–1234)
Otto II, Margrave (1234–1248)

Republic of Lucca –
Bonifazio Giudice di Vallecchia, Captain of the People (1251–1252)

Milan (complete list) –
Martino della Torre, Signore (1259–1263)
Napoleone della Torre, Signore (1265–1277)
Ottone, Signore (1277–1294)
Matteo I, Signore (1294–1302, 1311–1322)

Principality of Orange (complete list) –
William I, co-Prince (1180–pre–1219)
William II, co-Prince (1180–c.1239)
William III, co-Prince (c.1239–1257)
Raymond I, co-Prince (c.1218–1282)
Bertrand IV, Prince (1282–c.1314)

Papal States (complete list) –
Innocent III, Pope (1198–1216)
Honorius III, Pope (1216–1227)
Gregory IX, Pope (1227–1241)
Celestine IV, Pope (1241)
Innocent IV, Pope (1243–1254)
Alexander IV, Pope (1254–1261)
Urban IV, Pope (1261–1264)
Clement IV, Pope (1265–1268)
Gregory X, Pope (1271–1276)
Innocent V, Pope (1276)
Adrian V, Pope (1276)
John XXI, Pope (1276–1277)
Nicholas III, Pope (1277–1280)
Martin IV, Pope (1281–1285)
Honorius IV, Pope (1285–1287)
Nicholas IV, Pope (1288–1292)
Celestine V, Pope (1294)
Boniface VIII, Pope (1294–1303)

County of Savoy (complete list) –
Thomas, Count (1189–1233)
Amadeus IV, Count (1233–1253)
Boniface, Count (1253–1263)
Peter II the Little Charlemagne, Count (1263–1268)
Philip I, Count (1268–1285)
Amadeus V the Great, Count (1285–1323)

References 

13th century
 
-
13th century in the Holy Roman Empire